Rodrigo José Queiroz Chagas (born 19 March 1973 in Rio de Janeiro), known as Rodrigo Chagas or just Rodrigo, is a Brazilian football coach and former player who played as either a defensive midfielder or right-back. He is the current head coach of Atlético Alagoinhas.

At international level, he represented Brazil at the 1995 Copa América.

References

External links
 

Living people
1973 births
Association football defenders
Brazil international footballers
Esporte Clube Vitória players
Bayer 04 Leverkusen players
Sport Club Corinthians Paulista players
Cruzeiro Esporte Clube players
Paysandu Sport Club players
Clube de Regatas Brasil players
União São João Esporte Clube players
Bundesliga players
Brazilian football managers
Campeonato Brasileiro Série B managers
Esporte Clube Jacuipense managers
Esporte Clube Vitória managers
Brazilian expatriate footballers
Brazilian expatriate sportspeople in Germany
Expatriate footballers in Germany
Footballers from Rio de Janeiro (city)
Brazilian footballers
Sociedade Desportiva Juazeirense managers